Fratangelo is an Italian surname. Notable people with the surname include:

Bjorn Fratangelo (born 1993), American tennis player
Dawn Fratangelo, American reporter based in New York City for NBC News

Italian-language surnames
Surnames of Italian origin